Kahir-e Borz-e Bala (also Romanized as Kahīr-e Borz-e Bālā; also known as Kahīr-e Borz) is a village in Bahu Kalat Rural District, Dashtiari District, Chabahar County, Sistan and Baluchestan Province, Iran. At the 2006 census, its population was 557, in 115 families.

References 

Populated places in Chabahar County